Arun Adsad was the two term (1990 and 1999) member of the Maharashtra Legislative Assembly for Chandur constituency, now known as Dhamangaon Railway.

References

Living people
Maharashtra MLAs 1990–1995
Maharashtra MLAs 1999–2004
Bharatiya Janata Party politicians from Maharashtra
Year of birth missing (living people)